Ivan Obolensky may refer to: 
 Ivan Mikhailovich Obolensky, Prince, or John Obolenski (1853–1910), Imperial Russian Lieutenant-General
 Ivan Sergeyevich Obolensky (1925-2019), American financial analyst and corporate officer